Queen's Pier, Ramsey is  long and was built for the Isle of Man Harbour Board for the sum of £40,752 (about £4.3 million in today's terms) by Head Wrightson of Stockton-on-Tees, England. The designer was Sir John Coode, who later became president of the Institution of Civil Engineers. Construction work began in 1882 and the pier was officially opened on 22 July 1886 by Rowley Hill, Bishop of Sodor and Man, though it had already been in use for about one year whilst being finished. The pier was originally intended as a landing stage to allow Steam Packet ships to pick up or discharge passengers when the tide was low.

Tramway

The builders installed a  tramway on the pier to help transport building materials to the end of the pier. The tramway was intended to be dismantled once the pier was completed. However, Sir John added some passing loops and some sidings, so that passenger baggage could be moved easily up and down the pier without passengers carrying it. The only problem was that the luggage wagons had to be pushed by hand. As that also had to be pushed by hand, it was quicker to walk.

In the 1930s a locomotive powered by a Ford  engine was added: it travelled at just under . Originally operated by two hand-propelled carts for carrying luggage, it was later operated by a Planet diesel locomotive and carriage, and later still by a railcar.

Closure 
In 1970, the last steamer called at the Pier Head. Upon closing in June 1990 due to concerns about its safety, the rolling stock was removed to a small museum, apart from the long-disused luggage cart that remained on site. The "Planet" locomotive is preserved at Jurby Transport Museum.

Restoration
In 2015 the Ramsey Queen's Pier Restoration Trust (QPRT) started work with the Isle of Man Government to lease the pier. The harbour director had confirmed that a three-year lease was being drawn up to offer the pier at a peppercorn rent to the trust, who were beginning to raise funds to restore the first 50 m section. In March 2016, campaigners, who had been negotiating with the Manx government for a licence to access to the pier to carry out a survey of the structure, announced that they hoped to have the keys to the long-closed pier within two weeks. An initial three-year licence would enable a formally constituted trust to complete repairs to the first three bays, which would provide a better understanding of what the whole project would entail. On completion of this phase, it was intended that a 99-year lease would be granted to allow the remainder of the pier to be finished and brought back into public use. Local people were being urged to join the project group to help bring about the restoration. Ways of raising the cash needed for the restoration work were being explored, and a number of fund-raising events were being targeted. In May 2016, the gates of the 130-year-old Victorian pier were officially unlocked for the first time in 25 years when the government handed over the keys to the QPRT. It was estimated that full restoration could cost around £1.5 million. The pier would, however, remain closed to the general public. A QPRT spokesman said the next stage of their campaign would see a survey undertaken before a £60,000 project got underway to restore the first of 55 bays. In July 2017, the QPRT announced that work on the pier could begin after they signed a five-year lease with the Manx government. They plan to get the tramway up and running as soon as the pier refurbishment is completed.

The first three restored sections of the Queens Pier were reopened in July 2021. It was the result of four years' work by 20 QPRT volunteers, who hope to go on an restore bays four to eight—of 60 in total—in Phase two of the restoration. As part of the celebration, the tramway's original Hibberd locomotive and bogie carriage were loaned back to the pier by the Jurby Transport Museum. In October 2021, the Trust received a £50,000 lottery grant from the Dormant Assets Fund, which will enable the restoration to begin.

References

Piers in the Isle of Man